William Fremantle may refer to:

Sir William Fremantle (politician) (1766–1850), British courtier and politician
William Fremantle (uncle) (1807–1895), Anglican priest and Dean of Ripon
William Fremantle (nephew) (1831–1916), Anglican priest and Dean of Ripon